Cossulus argentatus is a moth in the family Cossidae. It is found in Turkey, Armenia and Iran.

References

Natural History Museum Lepidoptera generic names catalog

Cossinae
Moths described in 1887
Moths of Asia
Moths of Europe